Church's Hill Halt railway station served the village of Ashley, Gloucestershire, England, from 1959 to 1964 on the Tetbury Branch Line.

History 
The station was opened on 2 February 1959 by British Railways in an attempt to improve patronage on the introduction of a 'Railbus' on the Tetbury branch and the adjoining Cirencester Town branch. Other Halts opened on the branches at the same time were; Chesterton Lane Halt, Park Leaze Halt and Trouble House Halt. It closed on 6 April 1964.

References 

{Butt, R. V. J. (October 1995). The Directory of Railway Stations: details every public and private passenger station, halt, platform and stopping place, past and present (1st ed.). Sparkford: Patrick Stephens Ltd. ISBN 978-1-85260-508-7. OCLC 60251199. OL 11956311M.}

Disused railway stations in Gloucestershire
Beeching closures in England
Railway stations in Great Britain opened in 1959
Railway stations in Great Britain closed in 1964
1959 establishments in England
1964 disestablishments in England